is a railway station in the city of Fukuyama, Hiroshima Prefecture, Japan.

Lines
 West Japan Railway Company
 Fukuen Line
 Ibara Railway
 Ibara Line

Adjacent stations

|-
!colspan=5|JR West

|-
!colspan=5|Ibara Railway

Railway stations in Hiroshima Prefecture
Railway stations in Japan opened in 1914